Andrei Makarov (born March 8, 1964) is a Russian former professional ice hockey player. He played in the Russian Superleague as a member of Ak Bars Kazan.

References 
 

1964 births
Living people
Ak Bars Kazan players
Russian ice hockey forwards